This is a non-exhaustive list of Nicaragua women's international footballers – association football players who have appeared at least once for the senior Nicaragua women's national football team.

Players

See also 
 Nicaragua women's national football team

References 

 
International footballers
International footballers
Nicaragua
Football in Nicaragua
Association football player non-biographical articles